This is a list of video games for the Xbox video game console that have sold or shipped at least one million copies. The best-selling game on the Xbox is Halo 2, first released in the United States on November 9, 2004. It went on to sell over 8.46 million copies worldwide. The first game in the series, Halo: Combat Evolved, was a launch title which ultimately became the second best-selling game, selling over 5 million copies.

List

Notes

References

 
Xbox